Christine Flear (née Leroy; b. 22 April 1967) is a French chess player.

Chess career 
She has won the women's section of the French Chess Championship five times (in 1985, 1991, 1994, 1998 and 1999) and finished runner-up three times (1996, 1997 and 2002).

She participated in the 1998 Chess Olympiad and the 2000 Chess Olympiad.

Personal life
In 1986, she married Glenn Flear, an English Grandmaster. They live in France near Montpellier and have two sons.

References

External links 
 
 
Christine Flear chess games at 365Chess.com

1967 births
Living people
French female chess players